Doctor Bari is a Bangladeshi Bengali-language film directed by Azizur Rahman and written by A.T.M. Shamsuzzaman. The film was released on 17 July 2007 in Bangladesh. It was produced by NTV Production House and distributed by G Series. It is a family comedy film and stars Shakib Khan, A.T.M. Shamsuzzaman, Jona, Shabnaz, Amit Hasan and Salauddin Lavlu.

Plot
The film is about three doctors.

Cast
 Shakib Khan as Akkel Ali
 Amit Hasan
 Shabnaz
 Jona
 Suchorita
 A.T.M. Shamsuzzaman
 Salauddin Lavlu
 Khalil Ullah Khan
 Pran Ray
 Arjumand Ara Bokul
 Afzal Sharif
 A. K. M. Hasan

Production

Music
Doctor Baris music is directed by Imon Saha.

Soundtrack

References

External links
 

2007 films
2007 comedy films
Bangladeshi comedy films
Bengali-language Bangladeshi films
Films scored by Emon Saha
2000s Bengali-language films